Salvador Massip (1898 – death date unknown) was a Cuban first baseman in the Negro leagues in the 1920s and 1930s.

A native of Havana, Cuba, Massip played several seasons for the Cuban Stars (East) between 1925 and 1935. In 36 recorded career games, he posted 16 hits in 124 plate appearances.

References

External links
 and Seamheads

1898 births
Date of birth missing
Year of death missing
Place of death missing
Cuban Stars (East) players
Baseball first basemen
Baseball players from Havana